Tēvita Tuʻivakano (born Tēvita Polutele Kaho) was a politician from Tonga who served as Prime Minister of Tonga from 30 September 1912 to 30 June 1923.

References 

Prime Ministers of Tonga